Carex boecheriana is a species of sedge in the family Cyperaceae, native to Greenland. It is a host of the smut fungi Anthracoidea capillaris.

References

boecheriana
Endemic flora of Greenland
Plants described in 1957